"Give It Up" is the second single from American pop group Wilson Phillips' second studio album, Shadows and Light (1992). The single peaked at number 30 on US Billboard Hot 100 in September 1992, becoming the band's last top-40 single.

Charts

References

Wilson Phillips songs
1992 singles
1992 songs
SBK Records singles
Song recordings produced by Glen Ballard
Songs written by Glen Ballard